AFM

Naomi Ellemers (born 31 January 1963 in Amsterdam) is a distinguished professor of social psychology at Utrecht University since September 2015.

Career 
Ellemers studied social psychology at Rijksuniversiteit Groningen from 1981 to1987 and graduated in 1991 in Groningen with her thesis Identity management strategies, followed by a position as assistant professor and later as associate professor at Vrije Universiteit Amsterdam. Between 1999 and 2015 she was a professor at Universiteit Leiden with the assignment  sociale psychologie van de organisatie (Social psychology of the organization). Since September 2015 she is distinguished professor at Universiteit Utrecht. In 2019 she became honorary professor at School of Psychology University of Queensland in Australia.]

Ellemers is since  2015 member supervisory board PricewaterhouseCoopers Nederland.

From 2020 - 2022 she was chair of the KNAW (Royal Netherlands Academy of Arts and Sciences) advisory committee Breeding ground prevention of undesirable behaviour in academia.

Work 
Naomi Ellemers researches the way people live and work together in groups. She especially focusses on how people's behaviour is influenced by others around them - whether they are present or not. She does experiments on brain activity and physical stress, but also looks into how people behave at work.

Specialization: diversity & inclusion and integrity & ethical behaviour

In 2009, Ellemers received the KNAW Merianprijs (Academy Merian Prize). A year later she received the prestigious Spinoza Prize for her work regarding her specialization. In 2018 she received the senior Career Contribution Award of Society for Personality and Social Psychology. In 2019 she received the  Aristoteles Prize from the European Federation of Psychology Associates (EFPA), as well as an honorary doctorate from the Université catholique de Louvain.

In 2010, Ellemers was appointed member of Koninklijke Hollandsche Maatschappij van Wetenschappen (Royal Netherlands Academy of Arts and Sciences) and as of 2011 she is member of Royal Netherlands Academy of Arts and Sciences. In 2014 she was appointed corresponding fellow of the British Academy for the Humanities and Social Sciences, and in 2020 she was appointed member of Academia Europaea. In 2022 she had the honor of being nominated For the SPSP Heritage Wall of Fame and was she elected for the American Academy of Arts & Sciences.

In 2005 she together with three other prominent female professors, Ineke Sluiter, Judi Mesman en Eveline Crone, established Athena's Angels, an organization which defend the interests of women academics

Ellemers is one of the lead applicants and chair of the board of the NWO Gravity Program Sustainable Cooperation (SCOOP). She is one of the initiators of The Netherlands Inclusiveness Monitor which investigates the measures and actions organizations take to become more inclusive. It connects these findings to the experiences of employees and provides organizations with advice on which steps to take to become truly inclusive.

She cooperates with various compliance officers, among others Autoriteit Financiële Markten (AFM)  in order to give advice on and to reinforce behaviour and culture in organizations.

In 2019 the Dutch feminist monthly magazine Opzij elected her for the Opzij top 100 of most powerful women of the Netherlands in the category education and science.

Publications (selection)
Based on her academic acknowledgement, Ellemers writes popularizing texts about current issues. For the Dutch Financial Newspaper, Het Financieele Dagblad (FD), she writes a monthly expert column, and she writes a blog about 'social climates' for Psychology Today.

Her scientific work consist of more than 200 magazine articles, among others in Science, Proceedings of the National Academy of Sciences, Nature Human Behaviour, Academy of Management Review, Psychological Review, Annual Review of Psychology, Journal of Personality and Social Psychology.

A few distinctive publications are:

 Ellemers, N. (2021). Science as collaborative knowledge generation (Landmark article). British Journal of Social Psychology, 60, 1-28. doi:10.1111/bjso.12430
 Ellemers, N. (2018). Gender stereotypes. Annual Review of Psychology], 69, 275–298.
 Van Bavel, J. J., Baicker, K., Boggio, P. S., Capraro, V., Cichocka, A., Cikara, M., Crockett, M. J., Crum, A. J., Douglas, K. M., Druckman, J. N. Drury, J., Dube, O., Ellemers, N., Finkel, E. J., Fowler, J. H., Gelfand, M., Han, S., Haslam, S. A., Jetten, J., Kitayama, S., Mobbs, D., Napper, L. E., Packer, D. J., Pennycook, G., Peters, E., Petty, R. E., Rand, D. G., Reicher, S. D., Schnall, S., Shariff, A., Skitka, L. J., Smith, S. S., Sunstein, C. R., Tabri, N., Tucker, J. A., van der Linden, S., Van Lange, P. A. M., Weeden, K. A., Wohl, M. J. A., Zaki, J., Zion, S. & Willer, R. (2020). Using social and behavioural science to support COVID-19 pandemic response. Nature Human Behaviour, 4, 460–471.
 Ellemers, N. (2017). Morality and the regulation of social behavior: Groups as moral anchors. Milton Park, UK: Routledge / Taylor & Francis.  Neuroscience of prejudice and intergroup relations. Edited by Belle Derks, Daan Scheepers, and Naomi Ellemers. New York, Psychology Press, 2013. 
 Ellemers, N., & De Gilder, D. (2012). Je werkt anders dan je denkt. Business Contact. 
 Naomi Ellemers: Ethisch klimaat op het werk: Op zoek naar het nieuwe normaal, Inaugurele rede Universiteit Utrecht, 2017.
 Naomi Ellemers: Betrokkenheid bij het werk. Een kwestie van verstand of gevoel?, Inaugurele rede Universiteit Leiden, 2000.
 Social identity. Context, commitment, content. Edited by Naomi Ellemers, Russell Spears and Bertjan Doosje. Oxford, Blackwell, 1999. 
 Naomi Ellemers: Identity management strategies. The influence of socio-structural variables on strategies of individual mobility and social change. Proefschrift RU Groningen, 1991

References

External links 

 Profielpagina Ellemers, Universiteit Utrecht
 Athena's Angels
 Organisatiegedrag.nl
 GoogleScholar

Bronnen, noten en/of referenties

 ↑ Leidse hoogleraren - Ellemers, Naomi. Universiteit Leiden. Geraadpleegd op 24 januari 2021.
 ↑ Sociaal psycholoog Naomi Ellemers benoemd tot universiteitshoogleraar in Utrecht. Universiteit Utrecht (28 April 2015). Geraadpleegd op 24 januari 2021.
 ↑ (en) Our people - Social Identity and Groups Network (SIGN). Universiteit van Queensland. Geraadpleegd op 24 januari 2021.
 ↑ Raad van commissarissen. PricewaterhouseCoopers. Geraadpleegd op 24 januari 2021. "Naomi Ellemers is lid van de raad van commissarissen en van de commissie publiek belang van PwC sinds 1 mei 2015."
 ↑ Organisatiegedrag. organisatiegedrag.nl. Geraadpleegd op 24 januari 2021.
 ↑ (en) 2018 SPSP Award Recipients Announced - SPSP. Society for Personality and Social Psychology (Engelstalige Wikipedia). Geraadpleegd op 24 januari 2021.
 ↑ (en) Doctors Honoris Causa PSP-IPSY Anniversaries. Université catholique de Louvain. Geraadpleegd op 24 januari 2021.
 ↑ Ellemers, Prof. dr. N. (Naomi) — KNAW. Koninklijke Nederlandse Akademie van Wetenschappen. Geraadpleegd op 24 januari 2021.
 ↑ (en) Professor Naomi Ellemers FBA. British Academy. Geraadpleegd op 24 januari 2021.
 ↑ (en) Academy of Europe: Ellemers Naomi. Academia Europaea. Geraadpleegd op 24 januari 2021.
 ↑ (en) Core group. SCOOP - Sustainable Cooperation. Geraadpleegd op 24 januari 2021.
 ↑ Home • Nederlandse InclusiviteitsMonitor. Nederlandse InclusiviteitsMonitor. Geraadpleegd op 24 januari 2021.
 ↑ AFM en Universiteit Utrecht introduceren leerstoel ‘Psychologie van Toezicht’. Autoriteit Financiële Markten. Geraadpleegd op 24 januari 2021.
 ↑ Naomi Ellemers brengt wetenschap en praktijk samen. Universiteit Utrecht (20 December 2019). Geraadpleegd op 24 januari 2021.
 ↑ Naomi Ellemers. Het Financieele Dagblad. Geraadpleegd op 24 januari 2021.
 ↑ Social Climates. Psychology Today. Geraadpleegd op 24 januari 2021.
 ↑ Most Read Articles of 2020. Annual Reviews. Geraadpleegd op 24 januari 2021.
 ↑ Ethisch klimaat op het werk; op zoek naar het nieuwe normaal. Oratie Naomi Ellemers. Universiteit Utrecht (9 February 2017). Geraadpleegd op 24 januari 2021.

1963 births
Living people
Academic staff of Utrecht University
Dutch social psychologists
Corresponding Fellows of the British Academy
Academic staff of Leiden University
Members of the Royal Netherlands Academy of Arts and Sciences
Writers from Amsterdam
Spinoza Prize winners
Dutch women psychologists